Wheeler County Courthouse is a historic county courthouse in Alamo, Georgia. It is located at 119 Pearl Street. The courthouse is brick and has a columned facade on all four sides.

The town of Alamo was incorporated in 1909, and Wheeler County was formed, with Alamo as its county seat, in 1912. In 1914 a courthouse was built, designed the previous year by Ed Hosford as his last Georgia courthouse design. The courthouse burned down in 1916 and was rebuilt in 1917, in a design by Frank P. Milburn in the Neoclassical style. It was renovated in 1961. It was added to the National Register of Historic Places on September 18, 1980.

The courthouse is "relatively lavishly ornamented", relative to other Georgia courthouses, including in its pilasters and the elaborateness of its Corinthian capitals.

See also

National Register of Historic Places listings in Wheeler County, Georgia

References

External links
 

County courthouses in Georgia (U.S. state)
Courthouses on the National Register of Historic Places in Georgia (U.S. state)
Buildings and structures in Wheeler County, Georgia
Neoclassical architecture in Georgia (U.S. state)
Government buildings completed in 1917
National Register of Historic Places in Wheeler County, Georgia